The 4.7-inch gun M1906 (initially the M1904) was designed and issued by the United States Army Ordnance Department beginning in 1906, with the first units receiving the weapon in 1911. It was of the field gun type. It was one of very few pre-war US artillery designs selected for wartime production in World War I, although (as with most of these projects) few of these weapons were delivered to France and used in action. A combination of a limited pre-war munitions industry, the short (19-month) US participation in the war, technical problems with large-scale production, and the ready availability of munitions overseas led to this.

History
The design was orthodox for its time with a box trail and hydro-spring recoil system.  By the time of the American entry into World War I 60 had been produced and issued to the Army. Once the US entered World War I the US Army soon decided to adopt French and British artillery systems, and it was proposed to rechamber the 4.7-inch gun to fire French 120 mm ammunition. However, the presumed effect on production was too great, and this proposal was abandoned. Another source (Hogg) states that changing over to French ammunition (of which France had only limited production in this caliber) snarled production badly in late 1918. With the war over in November of that year, 149 guns and 320 carriages were produced between early 1917 and the Armistice, after which gun production apparently ceased but carriage production continued. By the time production probably ceased on 17 April 1919, of 960 guns and 1,148 carriages ordered from 1906 through early 1917, only about 209 guns and 470 carriages were completed, according to the official history of US World War I war production, America's Munitions 1917–1918. Sixty-four of these weapons (48 from pre-war stocks) were shipped to France to equip three regiments, of which two (the 302nd and 328th Field Artillery) saw action with 48 guns total. The official history does not mention switching the 4.7-inch gun to French ammunition, but does note that 994,852 4.7-inch shells were produced by the US through 1 November 1918; many of these may have been for British consumption. The majority of the weapons were probably used for training in the United States, as shipments from the US to Europe were primarily men and ammunition. Regardless of what type of ammunition it used, the weapon remained in US service, though in reserve storage, until 1932.

Williford states that total orders through early 1917 were 226 at Watervliet Arsenal. In early 1917 additional orders were placed at Watervliet (240 guns), Northwest Ordnance (500 guns), Walter Scott Co. (250 carriages), Studebaker (500 carriages), and Rock Island Arsenal (198 carriages).

The 24 weapons emplaced on fixed pedestal mounts for land defense in the Panama Canal Zone from 1918 to 1926 were the 4.7-inch howitzer M1913, not an M1906 weapon as some sources state.

Ammunition
Ammunition included a base-fuzed common steel shell containing  of TNT, and a shrapnel shell containing 711  balls with a 31-second combination fuze and optional tracer.

Surviving examples
Fort Sill, Oklahoma
Black Earth, Wisconsin: Veterans Memorial Park, Park St. & Mills St.
DeForest, Wisconsin: Veterans Memorial Park North Main Street / County Highway CV, DeForest, Wisconsin.
Camp Douglas, Wisconsin: Volk Field, Wisc. National Guard Museum
Institute of Military Technology, Titusville, Florida
Fort Howard (Maryland): Battery Harris Undergoing restoration, fall 2015.
Golden, Colorado: near Camp George West, Studebaker carriage No. 661 dated 1918
South Park (Pittsburgh): Allegheny County Park, Park Entrance on Corrigan Drive
North Park (Pittsburgh): Allegheny County Park, Pittsburgh, Pennsylvania
Fort Collins, Colorado: City Park, Playground Area. No. 340
Newport News, Virginia: Virginia War Memorial Museum, Huntington Park
Rogers, Arkansas: Barrel No. 583; undergoing restoration. To be displayed at Veterans Park.
Muskegon, Michigan: Veterans Memorial Park (M-120 causeway), pair
Shenandoah, Virginia: Corner of U.S. 340 & Maryland Avenue
Fork Union, Virginia: Fork Union Military Academy
Geneva, Illinois: Wheeler Park, pair next to the senior center
Bolton Landing, New York: Bolton Veterans Memorial, on Lake Shore Drive near Rogers Park
Cameron, West Virginia: Legion Memorial Park off of Main Street
Saxton, Pennsylvania: Saxton Community Parkway along 9th and Main Street VFW Post 4129 & American Legion Post 169
Pine Grove, Pennsylvania: Schuylkill County. Outside American Legion Post 374, 42 S Tulpehocken St 
Stillwater, Oklahoma: OSU ROTC Campus Off Knoblock and Athletic Blvd
Sandwich, Illinois: Sandwich VFW Post 1486 and American Legion Post 181 South Main St.
Morton Grove, Illinois:  Studebaker carriage dated 1918. American Legion Civic Center 6140 Dempster St.
Collinsville, Connecticut: Veterans Memorial on River St.
Chicago, Illinois: Front yard of a house in the 1500 block of N. Hoyne Street. Misidentified on sign as an M1912 howitzer.
Watervliet, Michigan: VFW Post 1137 Across the street from the High School and Hospital.

See also
List of U.S. Army weapons by supply catalog designation
United States home front during World War I
List of field guns

Weapons of comparable role, performance and era
QF 4.7-inch Gun Mk I–IV British naval gun of the same calibre, deployed as a field gun
Obusier de 120 mm mle 15TR A French field howitzer of comparable performance

References

Handbook of artillery: including mobile, anti-aircraft and trench matériel (1920), United States Army Ordnance Deptartment, May 1920, pages 161–177

SNL c-22

External links

Handbook of the 4.7-inch gun matériel, model of 1906 : with instructions for its care, November 19, 1910, revised September 15, 1917
4.7-inch gun detail photo page at PrimePortal.net
Blog post with photos of Gun 395 in front of VFW Post 1137 in Watervliet, Michigan

World War I artillery of the United States
120 mm artillery
Field guns